Syed Didar Bakht is a Jatiya Party (Ershad) politician and the former Member of Parliament of Satkhira-1.

Career
Bakht was elected to parliament from Satkhira-1 as a Jatiya Party candidate in 1988. He served as a State Minister in the Cabinet of President Hussain Mohammad Ershad. He joined Bangladesh Nationalist Party in 2000. He left BNP, after failing to get their nomination and joined the Liberal Democratic Party. He returned to Jatiya Party and was appointed presidium member.

References

Jatiya Party politicians
Living people
4th Jatiya Sangsad members
Year of birth missing (living people)
State Ministers of Cultural Affairs (Bangladesh)
Bangladeshi people of Arab descent